Manzar Sehbai (born 19 March 1950) is a Pakistani actor who appears in Lollywood films and serials. He has worked in different drama serials and made his film debut in 2011 with Shoaib Mansoor's Bol for which he won Lux Style Awards and SAARC Film Awards.
 In 2013, he appeared in Zinda Bhaag, Pakistan's entry for Best Foreign Language Film in 2013's Academy Awards.

Personal  life
Sehbai was born in Sialkot.  His father was Asar Sehbai, a public prosecutor who was transferred to Lahore when Sehbai was very young.  He attended Junior Model School, Lahore and then graduated from Government College Lahore. He went on to obtain Master’s in English from the same college. He is the brother of director and poet Sarmad Sehbai. He went to East Germany for higher education and lived in Germany from 1976 to 2011. He married actress Samina Ahmad in a private Nikah ceremony on 4 April 2020 in Lahore.

Career
Sehbai started his acting career from his college life as part of the renowned Dramatic Society of Government College where he worked together with Usman Peerzada and Salman Shahid in the Urdu-language play 'Darkroom'. He first appeared in telefilm Paani Ke Qaidi and then Keeh Janaan Main Kaun and many more. He made his film debut with 2011 with Shoaib Mansoor's Bol opposite Humaima Malick, Mahira Khan, Atif Aslam and Iman Ali for which he won Lux Style Awards and SAARC Film Awards. In 2013, he appeared in Pakistan's entry to the Academy Awards film Zinda Bhaag opposite Amna Ilyas and Naseeruddin Shah, which was critically and commercially successful.

TV dramas 
Paani Ke Qaidi 1972
Keeh Janaan Main Kaun, 1974
Boota from Toba Tek Singh, 1999
Alif 2019

Filmography

Web series

Awards

IMDB

References

Pakistani male television actors
Punjabi people
Pakistani male film actors
University of the Punjab alumni
Living people
Male actors from Lahore
1950 births